Eucalyptus panda, commonly known as tumbledown ironbark or Yetman ironbark, is a species of small to medium-sized tree that is endemic to eastern Australia. It has dark ironbark, linear to lance-shaped adult leaves, flower buds in groups of seven, white flowers and cup-shaped or hemispherical fruit.

Description
It has grey to black ironbark from the base of the trunk to the thinnest branches. Flowering occurs from May to November and the flowers are white.

Taxonomy
Eucalyptus panda was first formally described in 1958 by Stanley Thatcher Blake from material collected near Barakula by Samuel Roscoe Stevens in 1957. The specific epithet (panda) is from Latin meaning "bent" or "crooked", possibly referring the habit of this ironbark.

Distribution and habitat
Tumbledown ironbark grows in woodland in sandy soil on plains and low ridges from near the Carnarvon National Park, south to Texas in Queensland, and just into New South Wales near Yetman.

Conservation status
This eucalypt is listed as "listed concern" under the Queensland Government Nature Conservation Act 1992.

References

panda
Myrtales of Australia
Flora of New South Wales
Flora of Queensland
Trees of Australia
Plants described in 1958
Taxa named by Stanley Thatcher Blake